Idol or Idols may refer to:

Religion and philosophy
 Cult image, a neutral term for a man-made object that is worshipped or venerated for the deity, spirit or demon that it embodies or represents
 Murti, a point of focus for devotion or meditation in Hindu and Buddhist religion (not always man-made)
 Idol (philosophy), one of several concepts developed by various philosophers

Arts and entertainment
 In pop music entertainment, an idol refers to an entertainer, generally from their teens to mid-20s, whose image and attractiveness are marketed to maintain a close relationship and financial loyalty with fans
Chinese idol, a younger entertainer active in the Chinese entertainment industry
Japanese idol, a younger entertainer active in the Japanese entertainment industry
 AV idol, a Japanese adult video star
 Junior idol, a Japanese entertainer generally under the age of 15
 Net idol, a Japanese entertainer mostly known as an Internet personality
Korean idol, a younger entertainer active in the South Korean entertainment industry
Taiwanese idol, a younger entertainer active in the Taiwanese entertainment industry
Teen idol
Matinée idol, an adored film or theater star

Works
 "Idol" (Amanda Ghost song), from the album Ghost Stories
 "Idol" (BTS song), from the album Love Yourself: Answer 
 Idol (film), a South Korean film
 "Idol", an episode of the television series Power Rangers: SPD
 Idols (film), a 1943 Spanish film
 Idols (franchise), one of several television-shows which give formerly obscure persons an opportunity to become stars:
 Pop Idol, the original series in the United Kingdom
 American Idol, in the United States
 Asian Idol
 Australian Idol
 Bangladeshi Idol
 Canadian Idol
 Deutschland sucht den Superstar, in Germany
 Idol (Norwegian TV series)
 Idol Puerto Rico
 Idol (Swedish TV series)
 Ídolos (Brazilian TV series)
 Ídolos (Portuguese TV series)
 Idols (Danish TV series)
 Idols (Dutch TV series)
 Idols (Finnish TV series)
 Idols South Africa
 Idols (West African TV series)
 Indian Idol
 Indonesian Idol
 Kurd Idol, in Iraqi Kurdistan
 Nepal Idol AP1 TV
 New Zealand Idol (2004-2006)
 Nouvelle Star, in France
 Pakistan Idol
 Singapore Idol
 1DOL, a Philippine TV musical
 The iDol (film), a Japanese comedy movie

People
 Billy Idol, English rock musician
 Lodi (wrestler), also known as Idol
 Raffy Tulfo, Filipino senator and broadcast journalist, also known as "Idol" 
 The Idols, a professional wrestling tag team consisting of "Vicious" Verne Siebert and Rocky Dellesera who had wrestled for All Star Wrestling

Other uses
 Idol Records, a record label
 MYLIP, also known as IDOL "Inducible Degrader of the LDL receptor"
 Illinois Department of Labor (IDOL)

See also

 
 
 Golden idol (disambiguation)
 Idolatry, the worship of idols
 Idoli, a Serbian new wave band from the early 1980s
 Idolo, Jubert Doctor a.k.a. matinee idol
 Ideal (disambiguation)
 Idle (disambiguation)
 Idyl (disambiguation)
 The Idol (disambiguation)